Garth Richard Nix (born 19 July 1963) is an Australian writer who specialises in children's and young adult fantasy novels, notably the Old Kingdom, Seventh Tower and Keys to the Kingdom series. He has frequently been asked if his name is a pseudonym, to which he has responded, "I guess people ask me because it sounds like the perfect name for a writer of fantasy. However, it is my real name."

Biography
Born in Melbourne, Nix was raised in Canberra. He attended Turner Primary School, Lyneham High School and Dickson College for schooling. While at Dickson College, Nix joined the Australian Army Reserve. After a period working for the Australian government, he traveled in Europe before returning to Australia in 1983 and undertaking a BA in professional writing at Canberra University. He worked in a Canberra bookshop after graduation, before moving to Sydney in 1987, where he worked his way up in the publishing field. He was a sales rep and publicist before becoming a senior editor at HarperCollins. In 1993 he commenced further travel in Asia, the Middle East and Eastern Europe before becoming a marketing consultant, founding his own company, Gotley Nix Evans Pty Ltd. From 1999 to 2002 he worked as a literary agent with Curtis Brown (Australia) Pty Ltd before becoming a full-time author.

In addition to his work as a fantasy novelist, Nix has written a number of scenarios and articles for the role playing field, including those for Dungeons & Dragons and Traveller. These have appeared in related publications such as White Dwarf, Multiverse and Breakout!. He has also written case studies, articles and news items in the information technology field, his work appearing in publications such as Computerworld and PCWorld.

Nix currently lives in Sydney with his wife Anna McFarlane, a publisher, and their sons Thomas and Edward.

Bibliography

Very Clever Baby
The series was self-published and republished by Text Media in Melbourne. Described as books for "Very Clever Babies Aged 3–6 Months", they contain such words as ichthyologist, as used by the character Freddy the Fish.
 Very Clever Baby's First Reader (1988)
 Very Clever Baby's Ben Hur (1988)
 Very Clever Baby's Guide to the Greenhouse Effect (1992)
 Very Clever Baby's First Christmas (1998)

Young adult and children's literature

The Old Kingdom

Novels
 Sabriel (1995)
 Lirael (2001)
 Abhorsen (2003)
 Clariel (2014)
 Goldenhand (2016)
 Terciel and Elinor (2021)

Short fiction
 "Nicholas Sayre and the Creature in the Case" (2005). A novella produced for World Book Day and originally entitled "The Creature in the Cave". Reprinted under the new title in the collection Across the Wall: A Tale of the Abhorsen and Other Stories.)
 "The Nine Gates of Death: An Extract of the Journal of Idrach the Lesser Necromancer" (2009). A short story released on oldkingdom.com.au
 "An Essay on Free Magic". Short text released on the Old Kingdom website.
 "To Hold the Bridge". A novella original published in the Legends of Australian Fantasy anthology edited by Jack Dann and Jonathan Strahan. Reprinted in the collection To Hold the Bridge.
 "Doctor Crake Crosses the Wall". Short story included in the Australian edition of Goldenhand, also published on the official Australian Old Kingdom website.

Omnibus
 The Old Kingdom Chronicles (The Abhorsen Chronicles in the United States) (2009). This contained the first three Abhorsen books and "The Creature in the Case".

The Seventh Tower

 The Fall (2000)
 Castle (2000)
 Aenir (2001)
 Above the Veil (2001)
 Into Battle (2001)
 The Violet Keystone (2001)

The Keys to the Kingdom

 Mister Monday (2003)
 Grim Tuesday (2004)
 Drowned Wednesday (2005)
 Sir Thursday (2006)
 Lady Friday (2007)
 Superior Saturday (2008)
 Lord Sunday (2010)

The Left-Handed Booksellers of London
 The Left-Handed Booksellers of London (2020)
 The Sinister Booksellers of Bath (2023)

Troubletwisters (co-written with Sean Williams)

 Troubletwisters (2011)
 The Monster (2012)
 The Mystery (2013)
 The Missing   (2014)

Have Sword, Will Travel (co-written with Sean Williams)
 Have Sword, Will Travel (2017)
 Let Sleeping Dragons Lie (2018)

Works in multi-author series

Spirit Animals
 Spirit Animals Book 3: Blood Ties (2014, with Sean Williams)

Aussie Bites
 Serena and the Sea Serpent (2000), part of Aussie Bites series

The X-Files (young adult series)
 The Calusari (1997), an adaptation of the X-Files episode of the same name

Standalone novels
 The Ragwitch (1990), a children's fantasy novel
 Shade's Children (1997)
 A Confusion of Princes (2012), a young adult space opera novel
 Newt's Emerald (2015), a fantasy romance
 Frogkisser! (2017), a children's fantasy novel
 Angel Mage (2019), a young adult fantasy sci-fi novel

Works for adults

Sir Hereward and Mister Fitz
 2007 "Sir Hereward and Mister Fitz Go to War Again", in Jim Baen's Universe
 2008 "Beyond the Sea Gate of the Scholar-Pirates of Sarsköe", in Fast Ships, Black Sails edited by Jeff Vandermeer and Ann Vandermeer
 2010 "A Suitable Present for a Sorcerous Puppet", in Swords and Dark Magic, edited by Lou Anders and Jonathan Strahan
 2013 "Losing Her Divinity", in Rags & Bones: New Twists on Timeless Tales, edited by Melissa Marr and Tim Pratt
 2014 "A Cargo of Ivories", in Rogues, edited by George R. R. Martin and Gardner Dozois
 2014 "Home is the Haunter", in Fearsome Magics, edited by Jonathan Strahan
 2017 "A Long, Cold Trail", in The Book of Swords, edited by Gardner Dozois
 2020 "Cut me Another Quill, Mister Fitz", in The Book of Dragons , edited by Jonathan Strahan
 The first three stories are collected in Sir Hereward and Mister Fitz: Three Adventures (2011).

Short fiction

Collections 
 2007 One Beastly Beast: Two Aliens, Three Inventors, Four Fantastic Tales - a book of short stories for younger readers
 "Serena and the Sea" 
 "Bill the Inventor"
 "Blackbread the Pirate"
 "The Princess and the Beastly Beast"
 2005 Across the Wall: A Tale of the Abhorsen and Other Stories
 2005 "Nicholas Sayre and the Creature in the Case" (published for World Book Day)
 2001 "Under the Lake" (from The Magazine of Fantasy & Science Fiction)
 2005 "Charlie Rabbit" (from Kids' Night In collected for War Child)
 1996 "From the Lighthouse" (from Fantastic Worlds anthology edited by Paul Collins)
 2001 "The Hill" (from X-Changes: Stories for a New Century)
 2001 "Lightning Bringer" (from Love & Sex anthology edited by Michael Cart)
 1987 "Down to the Scum Quarter" (fromMyths and Legends, reprinted inBreakout! magazine in 1988)
 2002 "Heart's Desire" (from The Magazine of Fantasy & Science Fiction)
 2000 "Hansel's Eyes" (from A Wolf at the Door anthology edited by Ellen Datlow and Terri Windling)
 2003 "Hope Chest" (from Firebirds anthology edited by Sharyn November)
 1999 "My New Really Epic Fantasy Series" (from Swancon Program Book)
 2000 "Three Roses" (from Eidolon magazine, Autumn 2000)
 2004 "Endings" (from Gothic! Ten Original Dark Tales anthology edited by Deborah Noyes)
 2015 To Hold the Bridge
 2010 "To Hold the Bridge: An Old Kingdom Story" (fromLegends of Australian Fantasy anthology, edited by Jack Dann and Jonathan Strahan)
 2011 "Vampire Weather" (from Teeth anthology, edited by Ellen Datlow and Terri Windling)
 2008 "Strange Fishing in the Western Highlands" (from Hellboy: Oddest Jobs, edited by Christopher Golden_
 2008 "Old Friends" (from Dreaming Again anthology, edited by Jack Dann)
 2011 "The Quiet Knight" (from Geektastic anthology edited by Holly Black and Cecil Castellucci)
 2012 "You Won't Feel a Thing" (from After anthology edited by Ellen Datlow and Terri Windling)
 2012 "A Handful of Ashes" (from Under My Hat anthology, edited by Jonathan Strahan)
 2012 "The Big Question" (from Elsewhere, Edinburgh Festival Special)
 2009 "Stop!" (from The Dragon Book anthology edited by Jack Dann and Gardner Dozois)
 2008 "Infestation" (from The Starry Rift anthology edited by Jonathan Strahan)
 2011 "The Heart of the City" (from Subterranean Online magazine)
 "Ambrose and the Ancient Spirits of East and West" (from The Thackery T. Lambshead Cabinet of Curiosities anthology edited by Ann Vandermeer and Jeff Vandermeer)
 2007 "Holly and Iron" (from Wizards anthology, edited by Jack Dann and Gardner Dozois)
 2011 "The Curious Case of the Moondawn Daffodils Murder: As Experienced by Sir Magnus Holmes and Almost-Doctor Susan Shrike" (from Ghosts by Gaslight anthology edited by Jack Dann and Nick Gevers)
 2009 "An Unwelcome Guest" (from Troll's-Eye View anthology edited by Ellen Datlow and Terri Windling)
 2010 "The Highest Justice" (from Zombies vs. Unicorns anthology edited by Holly Black and Justine Larbalestier)
 2012 "Master Haddad's Holiday" (a bonus story from the Australian printing of A Confusion of Princes)
 2012 "Sidekick of Mars" (originally from the Under the Moons of Mars anthology edited by John Joseph Adams)
 2011 "Peace in Our Time" (originally from the Steampunk! anthology edited by Kelly Link and Gavin J. Grant)
 2011 Sir Hereward and Mister Fitz: Three Adventures
 2007 "Sir Hereward and Mister Fitz Go To War Again" (from Jim Baen's Universe)
 2008 "Beyond the Sea Gate of the Scholar-Pirates of Sarsköe" (from Fast Ships, Black Sails anthology edited by Jeff and Ann Vandermeer)
 2010 "'A Suitable Present for a Sorcerous Puppet'" (from Swords and Dark Magic anthology edited by Lou Anders and Jonathan Strahan)

Uncollected stories 
 1984 "Sam, Cars and the Cuckoo" in Warlock magazine no. 2
 1996 "The Kind Old Sun Will Know" first published in Eidolon magazine
 2005 "Read It in the Headlines!" in Daikaiju! Giant Monster Tales, edited by Robert Hood and Robin Pen
 2006 "Dog Soldier" first published in Jim Baen's Universe, 2006
 2007 "Bad Luck, Trouble, Death and Vampire Sex" first published in Eclipse, edited by Jonathan Strahan
 2009 "The Nine Gates of Death: An Extract of the Journal of Idrach the Lesser Necromancer" – first published on oldkingdom.com.au
 2010 "The Highest Justice" in Zombies vs. Unicorns, edited by Justine Larbalestier and Holly Black
 2013 "Crossing the Line" first published in Fearie Tales, edited by Stephen Jones
 2013 "Fire Above, Fire Below" first published by Tor.com
 2014 "Shay Corsham Worsted" first published in Fearful Symmetries, edited by Ellen Datlow
 2014 "Happy Go Lucky" first published in Kaleidoscope, edited by Alisa Krasnostein and Julia Rios
 2015 "By Frogsled and Lizardback to Outcast Venusian Lepers" in Old Venus, edited by George R. R. Martin and Gardner Dozois
 2019 "Dislocation Space" first published by Tor.com
 2020 "The Case of the Somewhat Mythic Sword" first published by Tor.com
 2020 "The Necessary Arthur" first published by Tor.com

References

External links

 
 Interview by BookBanter
 
 The Old Kingdom Chronicles (official)
 The Keys to the Kingdom (official)
 Garth Nix at Libraries Australia Authorities with catalogue search 
 

1963 births
Living people
Australian children's writers
Australian fantasy writers
The Magazine of Fantasy & Science Fiction people
Writers from Melbourne
People educated at Dickson College
Australian male novelists